Deserticossus arenicola is a species of moth of the family Cossidae. It is found in Russia (Dagestan), Armenia, Azerbaijan, Georgia, Turkmenistan, Kazakhstan, Uzbekistan, Kyrgyzstan, north-western China, Iran, Afghanistan, Pakistan, Egypt (Sinai) and Jordan.

The wingspan is 38–63 mm. The forewings are light ash grey with black markings. The hindwings are uniform grey. Adults have been recorded on wing in May in the Sinai desert and in March in Jordan.

The larvae have been recorded feeding on Tigrovaya balka, Tamarix ramosissima and Tamarix hispida.

Subspecies
Deserticossus arenicola arenicola (Kazakhstan, Uzbekistan, Kirghizia, northern Afghanistan, China)
Deserticossus arenicola iranica (Austaut, 1897) (Iran, Afghanistan, Pakistan)
Deserticossus arenicola transcaucasicus (Zukowsky, 1936) (Dagestan, Armenia, Georgia, Azerbaijan)

References

Moths described in 1879
Cossinae
Moths of Asia
Moths of Africa
Moths of Europe